Lingala can refer to:
 Lingala language in central Africa
 Lingala, Mandavalli mandal a village in Mandavalli mandal, Krishna district, Andhra Pradesh, India.
 Lingala, Vatsavai mandal a village in Vatsavai mandal, Krishna district, Andhra Pradesh, India.
 Lingala, Kadapa district, a village and mandal in Kadapa district, Andhra Pradesh, India.
 Lingala, Telangana, a village in Khammam district, state of Telangana, India.

See also
 Lingala music, a synonym for Soukous music